Vitalija is a Lithuanian feminine given name. People bearing the name Vitalija include:
Vitalija Bartkuvienė (1939–1996), Lithuanian painter
Vitalija Tuomaitė (1964–2007), basketball player

Lithuanian feminine given names